The 2021–22 UAE League Cup is the 14th season of the UAE League Cup. Shabab Al Ahli were the defending champions. The competition is set to start on 8 October 2021.

First round
Source: soccerway
All times are local (UTC+04:00)

First leg

Second leg

9th–14th place playoffs
This season's league cup will introduce a play off group for the losing teams in the first round to determine the final placements.

Quarter-finals
Both the defending champions and current league winners enter in this round.

First leg

Second leg

5th–8th place playoffs

Semi-finals

First leg

Second leg

Final

Final Placements

References

External links

UAE League Cup seasons
United Arab Emirates
2021–22 in Emirati football